The 2017 U.S. Women's Open was the 72nd U.S. Women's Open, held  at Trump National Golf Club in Bedminster, New Jersey, west of New York City.

The U.S. Women's Open is the oldest of the five current major championships and was the third of the 2017 season. With the largest purse in women's golf, increased to $5 million in 2017, it was televised by Fox Sports 1 and Fox Sports.

Park Sung-hyun won her first major title, two strokes ahead of amateur Choi Hye-jin. It was her first win on the LPGA Tour, after ten victories on the LPGA of Korea Tour. Seven strokes back at  after 36 holes, Park carded  on the weekend with consecutive rounds

Qualifying and field
The championship is open to any female professional or amateur golfer with a USGA handicap index not exceeding 2.4. Players qualify by competing in one of twenty 36-hole qualifying tournaments held at sites across the United States and at international sites in China, England, Japan, and South Korea. Additional players were exempt from qualifying because of past performances in professional or amateur tournaments around the world.

Exempt from qualifying
Many players are exempt in multiple categories. Players are listed only once, in the first category in which they became exempt, with additional categories in parentheses next to their names. Golfers qualifying in Category 14 who qualified in other categories are denoted with the tour by which they qualified.

1. Winners of the U.S. Women's Open for the last ten years (2007–2016)

Choi Na-yeon, Chun In-gee (8,12,13,14-KLPGA,16,17), Paula Creamer, Ji Eun-hee (10,16), Cristie Kerr (10,12,13,16,17), Brittany Lang (10,16,17), Inbee Park (5,6,7,9,12,13,16,17), Ryu So-yeon (7,12,13,16,17), Michelle Wie (17)

2. Winner and runner-up from the 2016 U.S. Women's Amateur (must be an amateur)

Virginia Elena Carta (a), Seong Eun-jeong (a)

3. Winner of the 2017 British Ladies Amateur Golf Championship (must be an amateur)

Leona Maguire (a,4)

4. Winner of the 2016 Mark H. McCormack Medal (Women's World Amateur Golf Ranking) (must be an amateur)

5. Winners of the Women's PGA Championship for the last five years (2013–2017)

Brooke Henderson (13,16,17), Danielle Kang (11,17)

6. Winners of the Ricoh Women's British Open for the last five years (2012–2016)

Ariya Jutanugarn (12,13,16,17), Stacy Lewis (10,16,17), Mo Martin (16,17), Jiyai Shin (14-JLPGA,16,17)

7. Winners of the ANA Inspiration for the last five years (2013–2017)

Lydia Ko (8,10,13,16,17), Brittany Lincicome (13,16,17), Lexi Thompson (12,13,16,17)

8. Winners of the Evian Championship  for the last four years (2013–2016)

Kim Hyo-joo (16,17), Suzann Pettersen (16,17)

9. Winner of the 2016 Olympic Gold Medal

10. Ten lowest scorers and anyone tying for 10th place from the 2016 U.S. Women's Open

Jodi Ewart Shadoff (16,17), Anna Nordqvist (13,16,17), Park Sung-hyun (14-KLPGA,16,17), Gerina Piller (16,17), Amy Yang (12,13,16,17)

11. Top 75 money leaders from the 2016 final official LPGA money list

Marina Alex, Katie Burnett, Chella Choi (17), Carlota Ciganda (13,16,17), Jacqui Concolino, Austin Ernst (16,17), Shanshan Feng (13,16,17), Sandra Gal, Charley Hull (13,16,17), M. J. Hur (16,17), Karine Icher (16,17), Moriya Jutanugarn (17), Kim Kaufman, Megan Khang, Christina Kim, In-Kyung Kim (13,16,17), Kim Sei-young (12,13,16,17), Jessica Korda (16,17), Candie Kung, Alison Lee (16), Lee Mi-hyang (17), Minjee Lee (13,16,17), Mirim Lee (12,13,16,17), Lin Xiyu, Pernilla Lindberg, Gaby López, Caroline Masson (13), Catriona Matthew, Ai Miyazato, Mika Miyazato, Azahara Muñoz, Haru Nomura (16,17), Su-Hyun Oh, Ryann O'Toole, Lee-Anne Pace, Park Hee-young, Pornanong Phatlum (16), Morgan Pressel, Beatriz Recari, Paula Reto, Lizette Salas, Alena Sharp, Jenny Shin (16,17), Kelly Shon, Sarah Jane Smith, Jennifer Song, Angela Stanford, Kris Tamulis, Mariajo Uribe, Karrie Webb, Jing Yan, Sakura Yokomine

Jang Ha-na (12,13,16,17) did not play.

12. Top 10 money leaders from the 2017 official LPGA money list, through the close of entries on May 17

13. Winners of LPGA co-sponsored events, whose victories are considered official, from the conclusion of the 2016 U.S. Women's Open to the initiation of the 2017 U.S. Women's Open

Katherine Kirk

14. Top five money leaders from the 2016 Japan LPGA Tour, Korea LPGA Tour and Ladies European Tour

Beth Allen, Aditi Ashok, Bae Seon-woo (16), Isabelle Boineau, Georgia Hall, Jang Su-yeon, Kim Ha-neul (16,17), Ko Jin-young (16,17), Lee Seung-hyun, Florentyna Parker, Ai Suzuki (16,17)

Lee Bo-mee (16,17) and Ritsuko Ryu (16) did not play.

15. Top three money leaders from the 2016 China LPGA Tour.

Supamas Sangchan, Zhang Weiwei

Shi Yuting did not play.

16. Top 50 point leaders from the current Rolex Rankings and anyone tying for 50th place as of May 17

Kim Min-sun (17), Lee Min-young (17), Lee Jeong-eun

Ahn Sun-ju (17), Jeon Mi-jeong, Kim Hae-rym (17), and Teresa Lu (17) did not play.

17. Top 50 point leaders from the current Rolex Rankings and anyone tying for 50th place as of July 9

Kim Ji-hyun did not play.

18. Special exemptions selected by the USGA

Qualifiers
Additional players qualified through sectional qualifying tournaments in May and June at sites in the United States, China, South Korea, England, and Japan.

May 22 at The Country Club at DC Ranch, Scottsdale, Arizona
Kyung Kim
Emma Henrikson

May 22 at Hino Golf Club, Hino, Shiga, Japan
Haruka Morita-WanyaoLu
Rumi Yoshiba
Tsai Pei-Ying
Fumika Kawagishi

May 22 at Butler Country Club, Butler, Pennsylvania
Bailey Tardy (a)
Laura Gonzalez Escallon

May 24 at Riverdale Dunes Golf Club, Brighton, Colorado
Jennifer Kupcho (a)
Robyn Choi (a)

May 28 at Poipu Bay Golf Club, Koloa, Hawaii
Kang So-whi (a)

May 30 at Industry Hills Golf Club (Eisenhower course), City of Industry, California
Brianna Do
Cheyenne Woods

May 30 at Diamond Oaks Country Club, Fort Worth, Texas
Dylan Kim (a)
Morgane Métraux (a)

May 31 at Legends Golf Club, Prior Lake, Minnesota
Belén Mozo
Casey Danielson

Jun 2 at BallenIsles Country Club (East course), Palm Beach Gardens, Florida
Dana Williams (a)
August Kim

Jun 5 at Oak Valley Golf Club, Beaumont, California
Paphangkorn Tavatanakit (a)
Mariel Galdiano (a)

Jun 5 at Lake Merced Golf Club, Daly City, California
Emily Childs
Ty Akabane (a)

Jun 5 at Lan Hai International Golf Club, Shanghai, China
Yan Liu

Jun 5 at Buckinghamshire Golf Club, Buckinghamshire, England
Carly Booth
Caroline Hedwall
Meghan MacLaren
Kelsey MacDonald

Jun 5 at The Legends at Chateau Elan, Braselton, Georgia
Jane Park
Rachel Heck (a)

Jun 5 at Hidden Creek Golf Club, Egg Harbor Township, New Jersey
Samantha Wagner
Thidapa Suwannapura
Stephanie Meadow

Jun 6/7 at South Shore Country Club, Hingham, Massachusetts
Nanna Koerstz Madsen

Jun 7 at Bogey Hills Country Club, St Louis, Missouri
Ally McDonald
Pei-Yun Chien

Jun 7 at The Woodlands Country Club (Gary Player course), Spring, Texas
Anne Chen (a)
Marissa Steen

Jun 9 at Sugar Mill Country Club, New Smyrna Beach, Florida
Jessica Welch
Wei-Ling Hsu

Jun 12 at Bradenton Country Club, Bradenton, Florida
Emma Bradley (a)

Jun 12 at Prestwick Country Club, Frankfort, Illinois
Ashleigh Buhai
Elin Arvidsson

Jun 12 at Woo Jeong Hills Country Club, Cheonan, South Korea
Choi Hye-jin (a)

Jun 12 at Muskegon Country Club, Muskegon, Michigan
Tiffany Joh
Lee Jeong-eun

Jun 12 at Governors Course, Chapel Hill, North Carolina
Natalie Srinivasan (a)
Lauren Stephenson (a)

Jun 12 at OGA Golf Club, Woodburn, Oregon
Becky Morgan
Brooke Seay (a)

Alternates added to field
The following players were added to the field before the start of the tournament when spots reserved for exemptions in various categories were not used and to replace players who withdrew from the tournament.

Sara Banke, Valdis Thora Jonsdottir, Nelly Korda, Bronte Law, Madelene Sagström, Maddie Szeryk, Alison Walshe, Ayaka Watanabe, Angel Yin

Nationalities in the field

Past champions in the field

Made the cut

Missed the cut

Course layout
Trump National Golf Club, Old Course 

Source:

Round summaries

First round
Thursday and Friday, July 13–14, 2017

Following over two hours of weather delays, play was suspended due to darkness on Thursday at approximately 8:33 pm EDT; 39 players were on the course and completed their rounds on Friday morning.

Second round
Friday, July 14, 2017

Third round
Saturday, July 15, 2017

Final round
Sunday, July 16, 2017

Scorecard
Final round

Cumulative tournament scores, relative to par
{|class="wikitable" span = 50 style="font-size:85%;
|-
|style="background: Pink;" width=10|
|Birdie
|style="background: PaleGreen;" width=10|
|Bogey
|style="background: Green;" width=10|
|Double bogey
|style="background: Olive;" width=10|
|Triple bogey+ 
|}

References

External links

2017 U.S. Women's Open at LPGA official site

U.S. Women's Open
Golf in New Jersey
Sports competitions in New Jersey
Bedminster, New Jersey
Women's sports in New Jersey
U.S. Women's Open
U.S. Women's Open
U.S. Women's Open
U.S. Women's Open